Flumen (plural: flumina), the Latin word for river, may refer to:

A trade name for Chlorothiazide
Flumen (planetary geology), methane or ethane rivers or channels on Saturn's moon Titan
Flumen (river), a tributary of the Alcanadre in Spain
Flumina (album), a 2011 album by Christian Fennesz and Ryuichi Sakamoto
An accessory cloud